The 2015 Arkansas–Pine Bluff Golden Lions football team represented the University of Arkansas at Pine Bluff in the 2015 NCAA Division I FCS football season. The Golden Lions were led by eighth-year head coach Monte Coleman and played their home games at Golden Lion Stadium as a member of the West Division of the Southwestern Athletic Conference (SWAC). They finished the season 2–9, 1–8 in SWAC play to finish in last place in the West Division.

Schedule

References

Arkansas-Pine Bluff
Arkansas–Pine Bluff Golden Lions football seasons
Arkansas-Pine Bluff Golden Lions f